Sentinels is an American esports organization based in Los Angeles, California. The organization was founded as League of Legends team Phoenix1 and competed in the North American League of Legends Championship Series (NA LCS). In June 2018, Phoenix1 rebranded to Sentinels. The company currently fields teams in Valorant, Apex Legends, and Halo.

History
Phoenix1 was founded in May 2016 as a League of Legends team to compete in the North American League of Legends Championship Series (NA LCS). After the NA LCS became a franchised league, Phoenix1 sold their LCS spot. Following, Phoenix1 partnered with Kroenke Sports & Entertainment (KSE) to launch their Overwatch League franchised team Los Angeles Gladiators for the video game Overwatch. After successfully launching the Overwatch team, the company rebranded to Sentinels in June 2018. Sentinels opened two new divisions in 2018; in June 2018, they entered Hearthstone esports, and the following month, they began their Fortnite division.

In August 2019, Sentinels co-founder and CEO Rob Moore filed a lawsuit against KSE; Moore alleged that KSE purchased the organization Echo Fox without his knowledge. Following the suit, Sentinels split with KSE, leaving the latter as the sole owner of the Gladiators.

In February 2020, Sentinels expanded into the competitive Halo scene. Two months later, they established their Valorant division.

Divisions

Valorant
Sentinels began their Valorant division in April 2020, signing former Overwatch player Jay "sinatraa" Won and former Counter-Strike: Global Offensive players Shahzeb "ShahZaM" Khan, and Hunter "SicK" Mims, as well as bringing in Jared "zombs" Gitlin from their Apex Legends division. In June 2020, they rounded out their roster with the signing of Michael "dapr" Gulino. After sinatraa was suspended in 2021, Sentinels acquired Tyson "TenZ" Ngo on loan from Cloud9 in March of that year for Valorant Challengers Stage 1 and 2. Sentinels won the first international event in the Valorant competitive scene, VALORANT Champions Tour 2021: Stage 2 Masters – Reykjavík, without losing any map points. In June 2021, Sentinels fully acquired TenZ from Cloud9, buying out his contract. In September 2021, Sentinels finished 5th–8th place at the Valorant Champions Tour Stage 3: Masters Berlin after a defeat to Team Envy.

Sentinels signed Matt “Weltis” Liu as their analyst in July 22, 2022. On September 21, 2022, Sentinels was selected as a partner by Riot Games to compete in the Valorant Champions Tour Americas League for 2023. Sentinels overhauled their entire Valorant roster by letting go of Shahzeb "ShahZaM" Khan, Jordan "Zellsis" Montemurro, Michael "shroud" Grzesiek, and Eric "Kanpeki" Xu and replacing them with Zachary "zekken" Patrone, Gustavo "Sacy" Rossi, Bryan "pANcada" Luna, and Rory "dephh" Jackson. Sentinels also let go of their head coach Shane "Rawkus" Flaherty and replaced him with Don "SyykoNT" Muir as head coach and Adam "kaplan" Kaplan as strategic coach.

Current roster

Halo 
Sentinels entered the Halo scene in February 2019, signing Halo veterans, previously of TOX Gaming, consisting of Paul "SnakeBite" Duarte, Tony "LethuL" Campbell Jr., Bradley "aPG" Laws, and Mathew "Royal2" Fiorante, with Chris "Royal1" Fiorante, as their coach. In October 2020, Sentinels announced the signing of Bradley "Frosty" Bergstrom, a two-time Halo World Championship winner.

Current roster

Former divisions

League of Legends

For Phoenix1's inaugural season, the team signed top laner Derek "zig" Shao, jungler Rami "Inori" Charagh, Sang-ook "Ryu" Yoo, bot laner Dong-hyeon "Arrow" No, and support Adrian "Adrian" Ma.

Fortnite
In July 2018, Sentinels began their Fortnite division after signing the players of North American team TT. Included in the signings were Owen "Animal" Wright, Jaden "rieo" Leis, Mike "mikeqt" DeMarco, and Cayden "Carose" Bradford. In March 2019, Sentinels signed Kyle "Bugha" Giersdorf. On December 29, 2022, Sentinels announced their exit from competitive Fortnite.

References

External links
 

Former North American League of Legends Championship Series teams
Defunct and inactive Super Smash Bros. player sponsors
2016 establishments in California
Esports teams established in 2016
Halo (franchise) teams
Esports teams based in the United States
Esports teams based in Los Angeles
Valorant teams
Apex Legends teams
Fortnite teams